"Love an Adventure" is a song by Australian pop group Pseudo Echo. The song was released in January 1986 as the second single from their second studio album, Love an Adventure (1985). The song became the band's third Australian top ten single, peaking at number 6 on the Australian Kent Music Report.

Reception
Cash Box magazine said "Australia's Psuedo Echo  has a punchy, synth-based pop sound with strong commercial potential."

Track listing 
7" (EMI-1657)
Side A "Love an Adventure" - 4:14
Side B "All Tied Up" (J. Leigh)

12" (EMI – ED 168)
Side A "Love an Adventure" (extended)
Side B "All Tied Up"
Side B "Love an Adventure" - 4:14

Charts

Weekly charts

Year-end charts

References 

1985 songs
1986 singles
Pseudo Echo songs